The ITV Panto is a series of televised pantomimes originally broadcast on ITV in 1998, 2000, and 2002, and have Rerun for over the last 20 years since they were filmed. All written by Simon Nye, they included an array of celebrities playing the lead roles.

Pantomimes
(In order of original broadcast date)
 Jack and the Beanstalk (original broadcast: 25 December 1998) - Filmed at the Old Vic Theatre.
 Cinderella (original broadcast: 2 January 2000) - Filmed at the Brixton Academy.
 Aladdin (original broadcast: 25 December 2000) - Filmed at the New Wimbledon Theatre.
 Dick Whittington (original broadcast: 1 January 2002) - Filmed at the New Wimbledon Theatre.

Recurring cast members 
All the main roles in each pantomime were played by well-known celebrities, some of whom became regular players, some major celebrities also made cameo appearances. Paul Merton and Julian Clary are the only people to appear in all four while Harry Hill and Griff Rhys Jones have appeared in two shows.

Cast

References

1990s British comedy television series
2000s British comedy television series
1998 British television series debuts
2002 British television series endings
ITV comedy
Pantomime
London Weekend Television shows
Television series by ITV Studios
English-language television shows